Vojislav Marinković (13 May 1876 – 18 September 1935) was a Serbian and Yugoslav diplomat and politician, serving two times as Minister of Foreign Affairs and briefly as Prime Minister during the dictatorship of King Alexander I.

Beginnings
Marinković was born in Belgrade, then capital of the Principality of Serbia, in 1876. His parents were Dimitrije Marinković, lawyer and politician, and Velika (nee Klajn). He attended secondary school in the city, graduated at the University of Belgrade Faculty of Law and later received doctorate in political science and economics in Paris.

From 1901, he worked in the Ministry of Finance and was director of the Business Bank. He was deputy of the Serbian Parliament from 1906. From 1914 to 1917, he served as Minister of Economy. Again minister at the end of 1918, he participated in the Paris Peace Conference, 1919.

Parliamentary period in Yugoslavia
He served as Minister of the Interior briefly at the end of 1921 and beginning of 1922.

He served as Minister of Foreign Affairs in the governments of Ljubomir Davidović (for a few months of 1924), Velimir Vukićević and Anton Korošec, last in the parliamentary term.

Royal dictatorship
With the proclamation of the 6 January Dictatorship in 1929, Marinković entered the cabinet chaired by the former commander of the Royal Guard, General Petar Živković. He replaced Živković as Prime Minister in April 1932, with the aim of changing the image of the dictatorship thanks to his experience as a veteran deputy and distinguished member of the Democratic Party.

During his short tenure as the head of the government, he softened political repression, allowing contacts between the old parties. His program, which was left unimplemented by his early dismissal, included the liberalization of the electoral law passed in 1931 and the revision of the 1931 Constitution, approved during the dictatorship. He publicly mentioned the possibility of calling a referendum on the federalization of the country, which upset both some of his ministers and the King, who relieved him in July 1932. He was succeeded as Prime Minister by his former Minister of the Interior, Milan Srškić, opposed to the rapid liberalization advocated by Marinković.

Personal life
He was married to Ana (1881–1973), painter and daughter of chemist Sima Lozanić. They had no children.

References

Bibliography
 
 
 

1876 births
1935 deaths
People from the Principality of Serbia
Serbian Jews
Democratic Party (Yugoslavia) politicians
Yugoslav National Party politicians
Politicians from Belgrade
Prime Ministers of Yugoslavia
Finance ministers of Serbia
Serbian economists
University of Belgrade Faculty of Law alumni
Burials at Belgrade New Cemetery